Neos Amfilochos Football Club is a Greek football club, based in Amfilochia, Aetolia-Acarnania, Greece.

The club was established in 2017, after the merger of Panamvrakikos Mpouka F.C. and G.F.S. Amfilochos in order to compete in 2017-18 Gamma Ethniki.

Honours

Domestic

 Aetoloacarnania FCA Cup Winners: 1
 2017–18
 Aetoloacarnania FCA Super Cup Winners: 1
 2016–17

References

Football clubs in Western Greece
Aetolia-Acarnania
Association football clubs established in 2017
2017 establishments in Greece
Gamma Ethniki clubs